Lake Mungo is a dry lake located in New South Wales, Australia. It is about 760 km due west of Sydney and 90 km north-east of Mildura. The lake is the central feature of Mungo National Park, and is one of seventeen lakes in the World Heritage listed Willandra Lakes Region. Many important archaeological findings have been made at the lake, most significantly the discovery of the remains of Mungo Man, the oldest human remains found in Australia, Mungo Woman, the oldest human remains in the world to be ritually cremated and as the location of the Lake Mungo geomagnetic excursion, the first convincing evidence that Geomagnetic excursions are a geomagnetic phenomenon rather than sedimentological.

Geology

Sediments at Lake Mungo have been deposited over more than 120,000 years. On the eastern side of the Mungo lake bed are the "Walls of China," a series of crescent-shaped sand dunes or lunettes, up to 40m in height, that stretch for more than 33 km, where most archaeological material has been found. There are three distinct layers of sands and soil forming the Walls. The oldest is the reddish Gol Gol layer, formed between 100,000 and 120,000 years ago. The middle greyish layer is the Mungo layer, deposited between 50,000 and 25,000 years ago. The most recent is the Zanci layer, which is pale brown, and was laid down mostly between 25,000 and 15,000 years ago.

The Mungo layer, which was deposited before the last ice age period, is the most archaeologically rich. Although the layer corresponded with a time of low rainfall and cooler weather, more rainwater ran off the western side of the Great Dividing Range during that period, keeping the lake full. It supported a significant human population, as well as many varieties of Australian megafauna.

During the last ice age period, the water level in the lake dropped, and it became a salt lake. This made the soil alkaline, which helped to preserve the remains left behind in the Walls. Although the lake completely dried up several thousand years ago, ground vegetation remained on the Walls, which helped to stabilise them and protect them from erosion. With the arrival of European settlers in the area since the 1880s, introduced species, notably rabbits and sheep, have destroyed the vegetation cover. Herds of feral goats are also present in the region. This has led to increased erosion of the dunes. However, this erosion has led to the uncovering of many human and animal remains. Wind has moved sand and soil eastwards from the Walls, forming a mobile sand dune which moves farther east every year.

Archaeology: Lake Mungo fossils
The most important findings at Lake Mungo have been Mungo Man and Mungo Woman. Mungo Woman, a partially cremated body, was discovered in 1969 by Jim Bowler from the Australian National University (ANU). Mungo Woman was only partially cremated before the remainder of her bones were crushed.  The time that was taken into her burial is demonstration of an advanced ritualistic process. She was initially estimated to be 25,000 years old, although a more recent multi-university study in 2003 determined that she was probably closer to 40,000 years old. Mungo Woman is thus the earliest known human to have been cremated. Mungo Man was also discovered by Bowler, on 26 February 1974. The remains were covered with red ochre, in what is the earliest known incidence of such a burial practice. Red ochre is commonly used in burials for ritualistic purposes. The site was dating using OSL dating, or luminescence dating. The site is dated to be 60 kya. If the fossils are actually from 60 kya, the fossils would be that of archaic Homo sapiens.

Mungo man
There is evidence of human habitation of the area around Lake Mungo that is as much as 50,000 years old. Stone tools have been found in the dunes which are older than the Mungo Man. Grinders for making flour have been found which are estimated to be between 5,000 and 10,000 years old; they were made of sandstone sourced from the Murray River basin 100 km away. A stone axe head, estimated to be at least 500 years old, was also found in the dunes; it was made from stone from Mount Camel, near Shepparton, well over 300 km away.

Genetic evidence has supported the theory of multiple waves of hominids moving into Australia. The migration is believed to consist of two groups moving into the continent at different periods. This would imply that hominids before 60 kya had the knowledge and skill to create a sturdy and sophisticated sea craft in order to sail all the way to Australia.

The different years for which artifacts and the remains were found puts into debate the actual time in which Australia was inhabited.  If it was inhabited 60 thousand years or over, it puts in question the theory that all civilizations derived from Africa. If, however, Mungo Man and Mungo Lady truly are evidence that Australia has only been inhabited for about 50,000 years, the theory of Africa is stronger than ever. This would put Mungo Man and Mungo Lady's civilization in the same time frame as other cultures that were just beginning to settle outside of Africa. The discovery of these remains is important to Archaeology because we discover the beginnings of cremation as a burial ritual and in addition we find more evidence for the "out of Africa" theory.

The rich archaeological heritage of the site is very significant to the Aboriginal Australian people from the area. The Willandra region is inhabited by the Barkindji, Nyiampaa and Mutthi Mutthi peoples, who have now entered Joint Management Agreements with the Government of New South Wales to manage the lake and the Mungo National Park.

Lake Mungo geomagnetic excursion
In 1972, Archaeomagnetic studies were conducted on the prehistoric aboriginal fireplaces occurring along the ancient shoreline of Lake Mungo. Magnetization preserved in oven-stones and baked hearths show that the axial dipole field moved up to 120 degrees from its normal position around 30,000 years ago. Called a geomagnetic excursion, the event occurred between 30,780 and 28,140 years BP with a very high field strength of 1 to 2×10−4 T (around 3.5 times higher than Earths current 5.8×10−5 T) which subsequently decreased to .2 to .3×10−4 T. There is also evidence of a second excursion around 26,000 BP with a field strength of .1 to .2×10−4 T. Because most of the excursions found before Lake Mungo were contained in sedimentary material, it had been suggested that the magnetic field directional anomalies were detrital or diagenetic in origin. The Lake Mungo results were due to thermoremanent magnetization, ruling out a sedimentological phenomenon.

Two excursions have been recorded in sediments from Skjonghelleren on Valderøy, Norway, with the Virtual Geomagnetic Pole (VGP) of one being synchronous with Lake Mungo. This suggests that the Lake Mungo event was global, rather than a local event. Data from lake sediments of a similar age in France having near identical magnetic field lines also support Lake Mungo being a global event. However, it has been suggested that Lake Mungo's anomalous field is the result of lightning strikes.

References 

Mungo, Lake
Archaeological sites in New South Wales
Pleistocene paleontological sites of Australia
Mungo, Lake
Paleoanthropological sites
Prehistory of Australia